Pasang-e Bala (also Romanized as Pāsang-e Bālā and Pāsang Bālā; also known as Pā Sang) is a village in Qaravolan Rural District, Loveh District, Galikash County, Golestan Province, Iran. At the 2006 census, its population was 2,038, in 529 families.

References 

Populated places in Galikash County